Jean Joire (5 September 1862 – 8 September 1950) was a French sculptor. His work was part of the sculpture event in the art competition at the 1928 Summer Olympics.

References

1862 births
1950 deaths
20th-century French sculptors
French male sculptors
Olympic competitors in art competitions
Artists from Lille